John Verelst, born and known also as Johannes or Jan (29 October 1648 – 7 March 1734), was a Dutch Golden Age painter. He was the youngest of three sons of the painter Pieter Hermansz Verelst; all became known as painters.

He is known for his portraits, especially of the men known as the Four Mohawk Kings, who visited Queen Anne in 1710 from the Province of New York in North America. (One of these men has since been identified correctly instead as a chief of the Mohican, a different tribe.)

Biography
Johannes Verelst was born in The Hague as the youngest son of Pieter Hermansz Verelst, a painter, and his wife. His older brothers were Simon and Herman. All three of these sons became painters, studying with their father from when they were young.

After becoming established, Johannes Verelst migrated to London in 1691, where he specialized in oil portraits and became known as John Verelst. Due to Simon using a slanting "S" in his signatures, flower still lifes in the manner of Simon Verelst are sometimes attributed to Johannes, while some of Johannes' portraits are attributed to Simon.

Mohawk Kings

To seal a treaty with the British, four Indigenous delegates (called "Indian kings" by the British)--three Haudenosaunee and one Anishinaabe--visited London in 1710. Queen Anne was so impressed by these tall, muscular foreign visitors that she had Verelst paint oilcolors of them in 1710 (see Four Mohawk Kings). This was one of the first paintings of aboriginal people. The chiefs had come voluntarily and were well treated as diplomats and entertained. They were Tee Yee Neen Ho Ga Row (Hendriks), Emperor of the Six Nations; Ho Nee Yeath Taw No Row (John), King of Generethgarich; Sa Ga Yeath Qua Pieth Tow (Brant) of the Maquas; he was the grandfather of Joseph Brant, a chief during the Revolutionary War and namesake for Brantford, Ontario; and Etow Oh Koam (Nicholas), King of the River Nation. They had been persuaded to come to England by Peter Schuyler, acting Governor of New York in 1709 and some-time mayor of Albany. They stayed one month and returned without having contracted any of the endemic European diseases.

The four portraits were later transformed into mezzotint prints by artists, including Anglo-French printmaker John Simon (1675–1751), and sold widely. The four portraits of these First Nations chiefs were displayed at Kensington Palace until 1977, when Queen Elizabeth gave them to the Library and Archives Canada. They were featured on a Canadian postage stamp in 2010.

Family tree

References

External links

See also Richmond P. Bond, Queen Anne's American Kings (Oxford: Clarendon Press, 1952).

Laura Brandon, War Art in Canada: A Critical History (Toronto: Art Canada Institute, 2021). 

1648 births
1734 deaths
Dutch Golden Age painters
Dutch male painters
Artists from The Hague